Lucas pseudoprimes and Fibonacci pseudoprimes  are composite integers that pass certain tests which all primes and very few composite numbers pass: in this case, criteria relative to some Lucas sequence.

Baillie-Wagstaff-Lucas pseudoprimes 

let Uk(P, Q) and Vk(P, Q) be the corresponding Lucas sequences.

Let n be a positive integer and let  be the Jacobi symbol. We define

 

If n is a prime that does not divide Q, then the following congruence condition holds:

If this congruence does not hold, then n is not prime.
If n is composite, then this congruence usually does not hold. These are the key facts that make Lucas sequences useful in primality testing.

The congruence represents one of two congruences defining a Frobenius pseudoprime. Hence, every Frobenius pseudoprime is also a Baillie-Wagstaff-Lucas pseudoprime, but the converse does not always hold.

Some good references are chapter 8 of the book by Bressoud and Wagon (with Mathematica code), pages 142–152 of the book by Crandall and Pomerance, and pages 53–74 of the book by Ribenboim.

Lucas probable primes and pseudoprimes

A Lucas probable prime for a given (P, Q) pair is any positive integer n for which equation above is true (see, page 1398).

A Lucas pseudoprime for a given (P, Q) pair is a positive composite integer n for which equation is true (see, page 1391).

A Lucas probable prime test is most useful if D is chosen such that the Jacobi symbol  is −1
(see pages 1401–1409 of, page 1024 of,  or pages 266–269 of 
). This is especially important when combining a Lucas test with a strong pseudoprime test, such as the Baillie–PSW primality test.

If  then equation becomes

If congruence is false, this constitutes a proof that n is composite.

If congruence is true, then n is a Lucas probable prime.
In this case, either n is prime or it is a Lucas pseudoprime.
If congruence is true, then n is likely to be prime (this justifies the term probable prime), but this does not prove that n is prime.
As is the case with any other probabilistic primality test, if we perform additional Lucas tests with different D, P and Q, then unless one of the tests proves that n is composite, we gain more confidence that n is prime.

Examples: If P = 3, Q = −1, and D = 13, the sequence of Us is : U0 = 0, U1 = 1, U2 = 3, U3 = 10, etc.

First, let n = 19. The Jacobi symbol  is −1, so  δ(n) = 20, U20 = 6616217487 = 19·348221973 and we have

Therefore, 19 is a Lucas probable prime for this (P, Q) pair. In this case 19 is prime, so it is not a Lucas pseudoprime.

For the next example, let n = 119. We have  = −1, and we can compute

However, 119 = 7·17 is not prime, so 119 is a Lucas pseudoprime for this (P, Q) pair.
In fact, 119 is the smallest pseudoprime for P = 3, Q = −1.

We will see below that, in order to check equation for a given n, we do not need to compute all of the first n + 1 terms in the U sequence.

Let Q = −1, the smallest Lucas pseudoprime to P = 1, 2, 3, ... are
323, 35, 119, 9, 9, 143, 25, 33, 9, 15, 123, 35, 9, 9, 15, 129, 51, 9, 33, 15, 21, 9, 9, 49, 15, 39, 9, 35, 49, 15, 9, 9, 33, 51, 15, 9, 35, 85, 39, 9, 9, 21, 25, 51, 9, 143, 33, 119, 9, 9, 51, 33, 95, 9, 15, 301, 25, 9, 9, 15, 49, 155, 9, 399, 15, 33, 9, 9, 49, 15, 119, 9, ...

Strong Lucas pseudoprimes
Now, factor  into the form  where  is odd.

A strong Lucas pseudoprime for a given (P, Q) pair is an odd composite number n with GCD(n, D) = 1, satisfying one of the conditions

or

for some 0 ≤ r < s; see page 1396 of. A strong Lucas pseudoprime is also a Lucas pseudoprime (for the same (P, Q) pair), but the converse is not necessarily true.
Therefore, the strong test is a more stringent primality test than equation.

There are infinitely many strong Lucas pseudoprimes, and therefore, infinitely many Lucas pseudoprimes.

An extra strong Lucas pseudoprimeis a strong Lucas pseudoprime for a set of parameters (P, Q) where Q = 1, satisfying one of the conditions

or

An extra strong Lucas pseudoprime is also a strong Lucas pseudoprime for the same  pair.

Implementing a Lucas probable prime test
Before embarking on a probable prime test, one usually verifies that n, the number to be tested for primality, is odd, is not a perfect square, and is not divisible by any small prime less than some convenient limit. Perfect squares are easy to detect using Newton's method for square roots.

We choose a Lucas sequence where the Jacobi symbol , so that δ(n) = n + 1.

Given n, one technique for choosing D is to use trial and error to find the first D in the sequence 5, −7, 9, −11, ... such that . Note that .
(If D and n have a prime factor in common, then ).
With this sequence of D values, the average number of D values that must be tried before we encounter one whose Jacobi symbol is −1 is about 1.79; see, p. 1416.
It is a good idea to check that n has no prime factors in common with P or Q.
This method of choosing D, P, and Q was suggested by John Selfridge.

(This search will never succeed if n is square, and conversely if it does succeed, that is proof that n is not square.  Thus, some time can be saved by delaying testing n for squareness until after the first few search steps have all failed.)

To start off, 

.
Next, we can increase the subscript by 1 using the recurrences

.
(Adding n does not change the result modulo n.)
Observe that, for each term that we compute in the U sequence, we compute the corresponding term in the V sequence. As we proceed, we also compute the same, corresponding powers of Q.

We use the bits of  the binary expansion of n to determine which terms in the U sequence to compute. For example, if n+1 = 44 (= 101100 in binary), then, taking the bits one at a time from left to right, we obtain the sequence of indices to compute: 12 = 1, 102 = 2, 1002 = 4, 1012 = 5, 10102 = 10, 10112 = 11, 101102 = 22, 1011002 = 44. Therefore, we compute U1, U2, U4, U5, U10, U11, U22, and U44. We also compute the same-numbered terms in the V sequence, along with Q1, Q2, Q4, Q5, Q10, Q11, Q22, and Q44.

By the end of the calculation, we will have computed Un+1, Vn+1, and Qn+1, (mod n).
We then check congruence using our known value of Un+1.

When D, P, and Q are chosen as described above, the first 10 Lucas pseudoprimes are (see page 1401 of ):
323, 377, 1159, 1829, 3827, 5459, 5777, 9071, 9179, and 10877 

The strong versions of the Lucas test can be implemented in a similar way.

When D, P, and Q are chosen as described above, the first 10 strong Lucas pseudoprimes are: 5459, 5777, 10877, 16109, 18971, 22499, 24569, 25199, 40309, and 58519

To calculate a list of extra strong Lucas pseudoprimes, set .
With this method for selecting D, P, and Q, the first 10 extra strong Lucas pseudoprimes are
989, 3239, 5777, 10877, 27971, 29681, 30739, 31631, 39059, and 72389

Checking additional congruence conditions
If we have checked that congruence is true, there are additional congruence conditions we can check that have almost no additional computational cost.
If n happens to be composite, these additional conditions may help discover that fact.

Although this congruence condition is not, by definition, part of the Lucas probable prime test, it is almost free to check this condition because, as noted above, the value of Vn+1 was computed in the process of computing Un+1.

If both of these congruences are true, then it is even more likely that n is prime than if we had checked only congruence.

If  Selfridge's method (above) for choosing D, P, and Q happened to set Q = −1, then we can adjust P and Q so that D and  remain unchanged and P = Q = 5 (see Lucas sequence-Algebraic relations).
If we use this enhanced method for choosing P and Q, then 913 = 11·83 is the only composite less than 108 for which congruence is true (see page 1409 and Table 6 of;). More extensive calculations show that, with this method of choosing D, P, and Q, there are only five odd, composite numbers less than 1015 for which congruence is true.

If , then a further congruence condition that involves very little additional computation can be implemented.

If n is prime, then, by Euler's criterion,
 .
(Here,  is the Legendre symbol; if n is prime, this is the same as the Jacobi symbol).

Therefore, if n is prime, we must have,

The Jacobi symbol on the right side is easy to compute, so this congruence is easy to check.
If this congruence does not hold, then n cannot be prime. Provided GCD(n, Q) = 1 then testing for congruence is equivalent to augmenting our Lucas test with a "base Q" Solovay–Strassen primality test.

Additional congruence conditions that must be satisfied if n is prime are described in Section 6 of. If any of these conditions fails to hold, then we have proved that n is not prime.

 Comparison with the Miller–Rabin primality test 

k applications of the Miller–Rabin primality test declare a composite n to be probably prime with a probability at most (1/4)k.

There is a similar probability estimate for the strong Lucas probable prime test.

Aside from two trivial exceptions (see below), the fraction of (P,Q) pairs (modulo n) that declare a composite n to be probably prime is at most (4/15).

Therefore, k applications of the strong Lucas test would declare a composite n to be probably prime with a probability at most (4/15)k.

There are two trivial exceptions. One is n = 9. The other is when n = p(p+2) is the product of two twin primes. Such an n is easy to factor, because in this case, n+1 = (p+1)2 is a perfect square. One can quickly detect perfect squares using Newton's method for square roots.

By combining a Lucas pseudoprime test with a Fermat primality test, say, to base 2, one can obtain very powerful probabilistic tests for primality, such as the Baillie–PSW primality test.

Fibonacci pseudoprimes
When P = 1 and Q = −1, the Un(P,Q) sequence represents the Fibonacci numbers.

A Fibonacci pseudoprime is often
defined as a composite number n not divisible by 5 for which congruence holds with P = 1 and Q = −1 (but n is ). By this definition, the Fibonacci pseudoprimes form a sequence:
 323, 377, 1891, 3827, 4181, 5777, 6601, 6721, 8149, 10877, ... .  
The references of Anderson and Jacobsen below use this definition.

If n is congruent to 2 or 3 modulo 5, then Bressoud, and Crandall and Pomerance point out that it is rare for a Fibonacci pseudoprime to also be a Fermat pseudoprime base 2.  However, when n is congruent to 1 or 4 modulo 5, the opposite is true, with over 12% of Fibonacci pseudoprimes under 1011 also being base-2 Fermat pseudoprimes.

If n is prime and GCD(n, Q) = 1, then we also have

This leads to an alternative definition of Fibonacci pseudoprime:
 a Fibonacci pseudoprime is a composite number n for which congruence holds with P = 1 and Q = −1.
This definition leads the Fibonacci pseudoprimes form a sequence:
 705, 2465, 2737, 3745, 4181, 5777, 6721, 10877, 13201, 15251, ... ,
which are also referred to as Bruckman-Lucas pseudoprimes.
Hoggatt and Bicknell studied properties of these pseudoprimes in 1974. Singmaster computed these pseudoprimes up to 100000. Jacobsen lists all 111443 of these pseudoprimes less than 1013.

It has been shown that there are no even Fibonacci pseudoprimes as defined by equation (5).

A strong Fibonacci pseudoprime is a composite number n for which congruence holds for Q = −1 and all P.  It follows that an odd composite integer n is a strong Fibonacci pseudoprime if and only if:
n is a Carmichael number
2(p + 1) | (n − 1) or 2(p + 1) | (n − p) for every prime p dividing n.

The smallest example of a strong Fibonacci pseudoprime is 443372888629441 = 17·31·41·43·89·97·167·331.

Pell pseudoprimes
A Pell pseudoprime''' may be defined as a composite number n for which equation above is true with P = 2 and Q = −1; the sequence Un then being the Pell sequence.  The first pseudoprimes are then 35, 169, 385, 779, 899, 961, 1121, 1189, 2419, ...

 

with (P, Q) = (2, −1) again defining Un as the Pell sequence.  The first pseudoprimes are then 169, 385, 741, 961, 1121, 2001, 3827, 4879, 5719, 6215 ...

A third definition uses equation (5) with (P, Q'') = (2, −1), leading to the pseudoprimes 169, 385, 961, 1105, 1121, 3827, 4901, 6265, 6441, 6601, 7107, 7801, 8119, ...

References

External links
 Anderson, Peter G. Fibonacci Pseudoprimes, their factors, and their entry points.
 Anderson, Peter G. Fibonacci Pseudoprimes under 2,217,967,487 and their factors.
 Jacobsen, Dana Pseudoprime Statistics, Tables, and Data (data for Lucas, Strong Lucas, AES Lucas, ES Lucas pseudoprimes below 1014; Fibonacci and Pell pseudoprimes below 1012)
 
 
 
 

Fibonacci numbers
Pseudoprimes